Iconisma macrocera is a moth in the family Blastobasidae. It was described by Walsingham in 1897. It is found in the West Indies.

References

Natural History Museum Lepidoptera generic names catalog

Blastobasidae
Moths described in 1897